Mastemoo is a village in Gosainganj block of Lucknow district, Uttar Pradesh, India. In 2011, its population was 2239 in 344 households. It is administrated by gram panchayat.

References 

Villages in Lucknow district